In mathematical analysis, the Lagrange inversion theorem, also known as the Lagrange–Bürmann formula, gives the Taylor series expansion of the inverse function of an analytic function.

Statement

where

The theorem was proved by Lagrange and generalized by Hans Heinrich Bürmann, both in the late 18th century. There is a straightforward derivation using complex analysis and contour integration; the complex formal power series version is a consequence of knowing the formula for polynomials, so the theory of analytic functions may be applied. Actually, the machinery from analytic function theory enters only in a formal way in this proof, in that what is really needed is some property of the formal residue, and a more direct formal proof is available.

If  is a formal power series, then the above formula does not give the coefficients of the compositional inverse series  directly in terms for the coefficients of the series .

where

is the rising factorial. 

When , the last formula can be interpreted in terms of the faces of associahedra  

 

where  for each face  of the associahedron

Example
For instance, the algebraic equation of degree 

Sketch of the proof
For simplicity suppose . We can then compute

If we expand the integrand using the geometric series we get

where in the last step we used the fact that  has one simple zero.

Finally we can integrate over  taking into account 

Upon a redefiniton of the summation index we get the stated formula.

Applications

Lagrange–Bürmann formula

There is a special case of Lagrange inversion theorem that is used in combinatorics and applies when  for some analytic  with  Take  to obtain  Then for the inverse  (satisfying ), we have

which can be written alternatively as

A generalization of the formula is known as the Lagrange–Bürmann formula:

where  is an arbitrary analytic function.

Sometimes, the derivative  can be quite complicated.

Lambert W function

The Lambert  function is the function  that is implicitly defined by the equation

this gives

A series that converges for larger  (though not for all ) can also be derived by series inversion.  The function  satisfies the equation

Then  can be expanded into a power series and inverted.  This gives a series for 

For example, substituting  for  gives the value of

Binary trees

Consider the set  of unlabelled binary trees. Denote by  the number of binary trees on  nodes.

Removing the root splits a binary tree into two trees of smaller size.  This yields the functional equation on the generating function 

Letting , one has thus  Applying the theorem with  yields

This shows that  is the th Catalan number.

Asymptotic approximation of integrals
In the Laplace-Erdelyi theorem that gives the asymptotic approximation for Laplace-type integrals, the function inversion is taken as a crucial step.

See also
Faà di Bruno's formula gives coefficients of the composition of two formal power series in terms of the coefficients of those two series.  Equivalently, it is a formula for the nth derivative of a composite function.
Lagrange reversion theorem for another theorem sometimes called the inversion theorem
Formal power series#The Lagrange inversion formula

References

External links

Bürmann–Lagrange series at Springer EOM

Inverse functions
Theorems in real analysis
Theorems in complex analysis
Theorems in combinatorics